Charles Van (died 1778) was a British politician who sat in the House of Commons from 1772 to 1778.
 
Van was the eldest son of Charles Van, of Llanwern, and his second wife Elizabeth Samson of Henbury, near Bristol. He married Catherine Morgan, daughter of Thomas Morgan on September 1754. Her father and three brothers were all MPs. He succeeded his father on 6 January 1755. In 1760 he built a new house at Llanwern Park.

Following his marriage into the Morgan family, Van stood for Parliament at  Glamorgan in by-election in 1756, but was heavily defeated. He stood for Monmouthshire at a by-election in 1765, but when the Morgan family gave their interest to his opponent, he withdrew. He was eventually returned unopposed as Member of Parliament for Brecon at a by-election on 31 January 1772. He was also returned unopposed at the 1774. He was strongly against the American colonists and was apparently an amusing speaker in Parliament.

Van died on 3 April 1778. His daughter Catherine married Sir Robert Salusbury, 1st Baronet and inherited his estate.

References

1778 deaths
British MPs 1768–1774
British MPs 1774–1780
Members of the Parliament of Great Britain for Welsh constituencies